Patcharapol Intanee (born 12 October 1998) is a Thai professional footballer who plays as a defensive midfielder and centre back for Thai League 1 club Nakhon Ratchasima on loan from Muangthong United and the Thailand national team.

Honours

International
Thailand U-23
 2019 AFF U-22 Youth Championship: Runner up

References

External links
Patcharapol Intanee at soccerway.com

Patcharapol Intanee
Patcharapol Intanee
Association football defenders
Association football midfielders
Patcharapol Intanee
1998 births
Living people